Central Asian pipeline may refer to:

 Central Asia–Center gas pipeline system
 Central Asia–China gas pipeline
 Bukhara–Tashkent–Bishkek–Almaty pipeline
 Kazakhstan–China oil pipeline